Barby Wells is a Republican Party activist. She is the founder of the Teenage Republicans.

References

External links
 Washington County Teenage Republicans

Living people
Year of birth missing (living people)
American political activists
Republicans (United States)